The following is a list of state highways in the U.S. state of Louisiana designated in the 750–799 range.


Louisiana Highway 750

Louisiana Highway 750 (LA 750) ran  in a general east–west direction from US 190 east of Swords to a second junction with US 190 west of Lawtell.

Louisiana Highway 751

Louisiana Highway 751 (LA 751) runs  in a general north–south direction from LA 35 to LA 752 north of Church Point.  The route's mileposts increase from the northern end contrary to common practice.

Louisiana Highway 752

Louisiana Highway 752 (LA 752) runs  in an east–west direction from US 190 at Swords to LA 35 south of Lawtell.

Louisiana Highway 753

Louisiana Highway 753 (LA 753) ran  in an east–west direction from LA 357 to US 167 south of Opelousas.

Louisiana Highway 754

Louisiana Highway 754 (LA 754) runs  in an east–west direction from LA 95 south of Church Point, Acadia Parish to LA 182 west of Sunset, St. Landry Parish.

Louisiana Highway 755

Louisiana Highway 755 (LA 755) runs  in a north–south direction from LA 368 south of Eunice, Acadia Parish to LA 91 within the city limits in St. Landry Parish.  The route has a spur that travels  along College Road from LA 775 to LA 91 in Eunice.

Louisiana Highway 756

Louisiana Highway 756 (LA 756) consisted of three road segments with a total length of  that were located in the St. Landry Parish city of Eunice.

LA 756-1 ran  along West Maple Avenue from LA 91 at South 12th Street to LA 13 at South 2nd Street.
LA 756-2 ran  along Camellia Avenue from the junction of LA 13 and LA 29 at North 2nd Street to North 1st Street.
LA 756-3 ran  along 1st Street from Maple Avenue to LA 756-2 (Camellia Avenue).

Louisiana Highway 757

Louisiana Highway 757 (LA 757) runs  in a general east–west direction from LA 3277 northeast of Basile, Evangeline Parish to LA 91 in Eunice, St. Landry Parish.

Louisiana Highway 758

Louisiana Highway 758 (LA 758) runs  in a general north–south direction from the junction of US 190/LA 95 and LA 95 Spur east of Eunice, St. Landry Parish to LA 95 south of Chataignier, Evangeline Parish.  The route has a spur that travels  along Woodstone Road from LA 29 to LA 758 southwest of Chataignier.

Louisiana Highway 759

Louisiana Highway 759 (LA 759) runs  in an east–west direction from a local road to a junction with LA 357 in Lewisburg.  The route's mileposts increase from the eastern end contrary to common practice.

Louisiana Highway 760

Louisiana Highway 760 (LA 760) consists of two road segments with a total length of  that are located in the adjacent St. Landry Parish towns of Grand Coteau and Sunset.

LA 760-1 runs  along Church and Academy Streets from LA 93 (East Martin Luther King, Jr. Drive) to a dead end at Schools of the Sacred Heart in Grand Coteau.
LA 760-2 runs  along Bellemin Street from LA 182 (Napoleon Avenue) in Sunset to LA 93 (East Martin Luther King, Jr. Drive) in Sunset.

Louisiana Highway 761

Louisiana Highway 761 (LA 761) runs  in an east–west direction from LA 365 southwest of Cankton to LA 93 south of Cankton.

Louisiana Highway 762

Louisiana Highway 762 (LA 762) ran  in an east–west direction from a local road to LA 343 southwest of Cankton.

Louisiana Highway 763

Louisiana Highway 763 (LA 763) runs  in a north–south direction from LA 191 south of Stanley to US 84 within the village limits.

Louisiana Highway 764

Louisiana Highway 764 (LA 764) runs  in a north–south direction along Marshall Road from US 84 in Logansport to a local road north of the town limits.

Louisiana Highway 765

Louisiana Highway 765 (LA 765) runs  in a northwest to southeast direction from the Texas state line to LA 764 north of Logansport.

Louisiana Highway 766

Louisiana Highway 766 (LA 766) ran  in a southeast to northwest direction along Keachi Road from LA 172 in Keachi to a local road at the Caddo Parish line.

Louisiana Highway 767

Louisiana Highway 767 (LA 767) runs  in a general north–south direction from LA 169 to LA 538 in Mooringsport.

Louisiana Highway 768

Louisiana Highway 768 (LA 768) ran  in an east–west direction from a local road to a junction with US 165 south of Pollock.

Louisiana Highway 769

Louisiana Highway 769 (LA 769) ran  in an east–west direction from LA 1 at Myrtis to US 71 at Mira.

Louisiana Highway 770

Louisiana Highway 770 (LA 770) runs  in a general north–south direction from the junction of two local roads to a junction with LA 127 south of Olla.  The route's mileposts increase from the northern end contrary to common practice.

Louisiana Highway 771

Louisiana Highway 771 (LA 771) runs  in a general north–south direction from LA 503 to a local road north of Jena.

Louisiana Highway 772

Louisiana Highway 772 (LA 772) runs  in a general east–west direction from LA 8 west of Jena to the junction of two local roads east of Jena.  Much of the route, including its entirety within the Jena town limits, is concurrent with US 84.

LA 772 heads north from LA 8 to a junction with US 84 in the community of Trout.  US 84 and LA 772 travel eastward concurrently through the small community of Midway and into the town of Jena, where the route travels along Oak Street.  In the center of Jena, US 84/LA 772 intersects LA 127 (North 1st Street) and begins a concurrency with LA 8.  Just beyond LA 459 (Aimwell Road), US 84 and LA 8 curve to the southeast while LA 772 branches due east onto Old Harrisonburg Road.  After existing Jena, LA 772 proceeds northeast and follows Hatchery Road into an area known as Routon, where state maintenance ends at an intersection with Pritchard Road.  The route continues straight ahead as Routon Road under local control.

Louisiana Highway 773

Louisiana Highway 773 (LA 773) runs  in a north–south direction from a local road to a junction with LA 8 southwest of Jena.  The route's mileposts increase from the northern end contrary to common practice.

Louisiana Highway 774

Louisiana Highway 774 (LA 774) runs  in a northwest to southeast direction from LA 8 to LA 773 southwest of Jena.

Louisiana Highway 775

Louisiana Highway 775 (LA 775) ran  in an east–west direction from LA 774 to LA 773 southwest of Jena.

Louisiana Highway 776

Louisiana Highway 776 (LA 776) runs  in a north–south direction from the junction of two local roads to a junction with LA 127 east of Catahoula Lake.

Louisiana Highway 777

Louisiana Highway 777 (LA 777) runs  in a north–south direction from LA 127 to a local road south of Jena.  The route's mileposts increase from the northern end contrary to common practice.

Louisiana Highway 778

Louisiana Highway 778 (LA 778) runs  in a general east–west direction from US 84 in Midway to LA 127 in Jena.

Louisiana Highway 779

Louisiana Highway 779 (LA 779) ran  in a north–south direction from a dead end to a junction with US 165 east of Tullos.

Louisiana Highway 780

Louisiana Highway 780 (LA 780) ran  in a general east–west direction from LA 168 west of Ida to US 71 south of Ida.

Louisiana Highway 781

Louisiana Highway 781 (LA 781) ran  in a north–south direction from US 190 to LA 104 west of Opelousas.

Louisiana Highway 782

Louisiana Highway 782 (LA 782) consists of one road segment with a total length of  that is located in the Bossier Parish city of Bossier City.  Two of the original three segments have been deleted since the 1955 Louisiana Highway renumbering.

LA 782-1 ran  along Patricia Drive from Waller Avenue to LA 185 (Northgate Road).  The route was deleted in 2000.
LA 782-2 runs  along Industrial Drive from LA 72 (Old Minden Road) to the concurrent US 79/US 80 (East Texas Street).
LA 782-3 ran  along Traffic Street from US 71 (Barksdale Boulevard) to the concurrent US 79/US 80 (East Texas Street).  The route was deleted in 1967.

Louisiana Highway 783

Louisiana Highway 783 (LA 783) runs  in a north–south direction from US 71 north of Coushatta, Red River Parish to US 371 south of Ringgold, Bienville Parish.

Louisiana Highway 784

Louisiana Highway 784 (LA 784) runs  in an east–west direction from the concurrent US 71/US 84 east of Coushatta to LA 507 south of Martin.

Louisiana Highway 785

Louisiana Highway 785 (LA 785) ran  in a north–south direction from LA 538 northwest of Blanchard to a dead end east of Mooringsport.

Louisiana Highway 786

Louisiana Highway 786 (LA 786) runs  in an east–west direction from US 371 west of Martin to LA 507 within the village limits.

Louisiana Highway 787

Louisiana Highway 787 (LA 787) runs  in a north–south direction from LA 507 south of Martin to LA 155 within the village limits.

Louisiana Highway 788

Louisiana Highway 788 (LA 788) runs  in a northwest to southeast direction from LA 514 in Hall Summit to US 371 southeast of the village limits.

Louisiana Highway 789

Louisiana Highway 789 (LA 789) runs  in a north–south direction from the junction of LA 5 and LA 172 in Keachi, DeSoto Parish to a junction with LA 169 south of Spring Ridge, Caddo Parish.

Louisiana Highway 790

Louisiana Highway 790 (LA 790) runs  in an east–west direction from LA 4 to US 371 south of Ringgold.

Louisiana Highway 791

Louisiana Highway 791 (LA 791) ran  in a northwest to southeast direction from the Webster Parish line to a junction with LA 7 north of Ringgold.

Louisiana Highway 792

Louisiana Highway 792 (LA 792) runs  in a north–south direction from LA 4 in Castor, Bienville Parish to LA 531 in Heflin, Webster Parish.

Louisiana Highway 793

Louisiana Highway 793 (LA 793) runs  in an east–west direction from a local road to a junction with LA 154 southeast of Mount Lebanon.

Louisiana Highway 794

Louisiana Highway 794 (LA 794) runs  in a southwest to northeast direction from LA 793 southwest of Mount Lebanon to LA 154 in Gibsland.

Louisiana Highway 795

Louisiana Highway 795 (LA 795) runs  in a southwest to northeast direction from LA 793 southwest of Mount Lebanon to LA 154 north of the town limits.

Louisiana Highway 796

Louisiana Highway 796 (LA 796) runs  in an east–west direction from LA 508 to LA 155 east of Bienville.

Louisiana Highway 797

Louisiana Highway 797 (LA 797) runs  in a north–south direction from LA 507 northeast of Bienville to LA 147 east of Bryceland.

Louisiana Highway 798

Louisiana Highway 798 (LA 798) consists of three road segments with a total length of  that are located in the Bienville Parish town of Arcadia.

LA 798-1 runs  along Second Street from the junction of US 80/LA 9 and LA 519 at Beech Street to LA 151 (North Hazel Street).  The route is co-signed as US 80 Truck.
LA 798-2 runs  along Sixth Street from LA 9 to LA 151 (North Hazel Street).
LA 798-3 runs  primarily along Locust Street off of LA 9 (South Hazel Street).  The route also makes a loop around a block of public buildings, traveling along Maple, Chestnut, and Beech Streets.

Louisiana Highway 799

Louisiana Highway 799 (LA 799) runs  in a southeast to northwest direction from the junction of US 80 and LA 154 to a second junction with US 80 in Gibsland.  The route is co-signed as US 80 Truck.

The route originally consisted of two distinct road segments, but these were combined into a shorter linear route soon after the 1955 Louisiana Highway renumbering:
LA 799-1 ran  along Gibbs Street from LA 794 (Oak Grove Road) to US 80 (South First Street).
LA 799-2 ran  along South Third Street from LA 799-1 (Gibbs Street) to the junction of US 80 and LA 154 at South Main Street.

See also

References

External links
Maps / GIS Data Homepage, Louisiana Department of Transportation and Development